The 2001 Talladega 500 was a NASCAR Winston Cup Series racing event that took place on April 22, 2001, at Talladega Superspeedway in Talladega, Alabama. A prize purse with a grand total of $3,233,740 was used ($ when adjusted for inflation); with $173,855 being used as the winner's portion of the earnings ($ when adjusted for inflation).

Race report
Kenny Wallace, Kyle Petty, Rick Mast, Hut Stricklin and Andy Hillenburg would fail to qualify for this race.

Stacy Compton would be credited with a last-place finish due to engine failure on lap 116 of the 188-lap race. All 43 of the drivers that appeared on the grid were American-born. Bobby Hamilton would defeat Tony Stewart (who drove the No. 20 Pontiac for Joe Gibbs Racing at that time) by 2/10ths of a second after racing a completely caution-free race for almost three hours. Other notable drivers in this race included: Kurt Busch, Mark Martin, Bobby Labonte, Joe Nemechek, Dale Earnhardt Jr. and Jeff Burton.

Sterling Marlin had the best car in the race but finished in 23rd place; leading 51 laps and overtaking competitors like Michael Waltrip, Dale Earnhardt, Jr., Jeff Burton, and Stacy Compton. While Marlin was the class of the field it appeared, he made all the wrong moves late in the race and got shuffled way back. Marlin should have adapted to the changing ways of the NASCAR Winston Cup Series as opposed to using the same old racing strategies that brought him success back in 1995.

This was the only time Andy Houston led a lap in a Cup race. Mike Skinner, who finished 29th, crossed the finish line less than 4 seconds behind winner Bobby Hamilton.

It was amazing that a pack of 30 cars could run 4 sometimes 5 wide and not make a mistake. All 43 drivers who were involved in the event competed with the greatest level on competency.  This is one of a just a few races that could have entertained audience members even if it had gone on for an extra 100 miles.

Despite the lack of a big crash in the crucial moments of the race, there were still some exciting parts in the race for NASCAR fans in the form of lead changes and drivers leading multiple laps. The last event to end without any caution periods was in 1999. It would be Hamilton's last win. He died 6 years later from head and neck cancer.

References

Talladega 500
Talladega 500
NASCAR races at Talladega Superspeedway